Edwin A. Loberg (February 20, 1915 – February 28, 2004) was a colonel in the United States Air Force.

Biography
A native of Tigerton, Wisconsin, Loberg was born on February 20, 1915. He graduated from what is now the University of Wisconsin-Stevens Point and married June Madsen and had 3 sons, 2 grand daughters. Loberg died on February 28, 2004, and is buried at Arlington National Cemetery.

Career
Loberg first joined the United States Army Air Corps in 1941. After being commissioned an officer, he was assigned to the 26th Bombardment Squadron based at Hickam Field where he survived the Attack on Pearl Harbor on December 7, 1941. During World War II he piloted the Boeing B-17 Flying Fortress and the Boeing B-29 Superfortress. On October 23, 1942, Loberg engaged in a 45-minute-long dogfight against a Japanese Kawanishi H6K that was attacking a U.S. Navy patrol boat. As it is highly unusual for a bomber to engage in such action, the event garnered much attention and was featured in a book written by Ira Wolfert and was the subject of a painting entitled "An Interesting Dog Fight" by artist Stan Stokes. On June 15, 1944, Lt. Col. Loberg piloted the first plane over Yawata, Japan, flying "Pathfinder" for the entire mission.  This mission was the first land-based plane bombing of the homeland of the Japanese Empire, and the first raid since the Doolittle Raid in April 1944.  During the Korean War Loberg served as Deputy Chief of Staff of the War Planning Room of Strategic Air Command. Later assignments included serving at The Pentagon and as Chief of Staff of Bolling Air Force Base. He retired in 1968.

Awards he received include the Silver Star, the Distinguished Flying Cross, and the Air Medal.

References

1915 births
2004 deaths
United States Army Air Forces bomber pilots of World War II
United States Air Force personnel of the Korean War
United States Air Force colonels
United States Army Air Forces officers
Recipients of the Silver Star
Recipients of the Distinguished Flying Cross (United States)
Recipients of the Air Medal
University of Wisconsin–Stevens Point alumni
People from Tigerton, Wisconsin
Military personnel from Wisconsin
Burials at Arlington National Cemetery